Yunnanozoon lividum (Yunnan + Greek ζῷον zôion, lividum; "livid animal of Yunnan") is an extinct species of possible vertebrate or chordate from the Lower Cambrian, Chengjiang biota of Yunnan province, China. It is thought of as a deuterostome suspected of being either a hemichordate or chordate. In 2022, a study reanalyzed fossils of Yunnanozoon and found it to be one of the earliest members of the vertebrate family tree.

Yunnanozoon is similar to the form Haikouella, which is almost certainly a chordate. Still, there are anatomical differences from Haikouella, including a smaller stomach and much larger (1 mm) pharyngeal teeth. It is by no means certain whether Yunannozoon possessed features such as a heart, gills, etc., which are seen in well-preserved specimens of Haikouella. Yunnanozoon somewhat resembles the Middle Cambrian Pikaia from the Burgess shale of British Columbia in Canada. Thirteen pairs of symmetrically arranged gonads have been identified, as have possible gill slits. However, some authors think that Yunnanozoon is closely related to the chordate Haikouella and that Yunnanozoon is probably a chordate rather than a hemichordate. A close relationship between Yunnanozoon and the taxon Vetulicolia has also been proposed.

An analysis in 2015 placed Haikouella as a junior synonym of Yunnanozoon.

See also
 Cristozoa

References

External links 
 A picture can be found at https://web.archive.org/web/20030511135309/http://www.gs-rc.org:80/repo/repoe.htm

Maotianshan shales fossils
Enigmatic deuterostome taxa
Cambrian chordates
Fossil taxa described in 1995
Prehistoric chordate genera
Chordates
Cambrian genus extinctions